Bécourt is a commune in the Pas-de-Calais department in the Hauts-de-France region in northern France.

Geography
A village situated some 13 miles (20 km) southeast of Boulogne-sur-Mer on the D156 road.

Population

See also
Communes of the Pas-de-Calais department

References

Communes of Pas-de-Calais